The St. Philomena's Church is a religious building belonging to the Catholic Church located in the town of Paradera, on the Caribbean island of Aruba, an autonomous country in the Kingdom of the Netherlands in the Lesser Antilles.

The temple follows the Roman or Latin rite and depends on the Catholic Diocese of Willemstad (Dioecesis Gulielmopolitana). As its name implies was dedicated to St. Philomena, a Greek virgin and martyr venerated in the Catholic Church.

It is also a major tourist attraction in Paradera, as the building dominates the skyline compared to the rest of the local architecture.

See also
Roman Catholicism in Aruba
St. Philomena's Church (disambiguation)

References

Roman Catholic churches in Aruba
Buildings and structures in Aruba